Massimo Demarin (born 25 August 1979 in Pula) is a Croatian former professional cyclist.

Major results

2002
1st  Road race, National Road Championships
1st Stage 2 Jadranska Magistrala
2003
 National Road Championships
3rd Road race
3rd Time trial
2004
1st Overall The Paths of King Nikola
1st Stage 2
3rd Road race, National Road Championships
2006
2nd Road race, National Road Championships
2013
2nd Time trial, National Road Championships

References

External links

1979 births
Living people
Croatian male cyclists